Antiplanes abyssalis is a species of sea snail, a marine gastropod mollusk in the family Pseudomelatomidae.

Description

Distribution
This marine species occurs off the Kurile Islands, Russia

References

 Kantor, Yu I., and A. V. Sysoev. "Mollusks of the genus Antiplanes (Gastropoda: Turridae) of the northwestern Pacific Ocean." The Nautilus 105.4 (1991): 119–146.

External links
 

abyssalis
Gastropods described in 1991